EN 16034 refers to a set of European standards which specify the technical performance characteristics for fire resisting and/or smoke control products, or better known in common language as fire/smoke doors or fire/smoke proof doors.
Compliance with this standard requires to fulfill the requirements of the Construction Product Regulation for construction products (short CPR), which are placed on the EU market with the intention to become permanent parts of a construction.

The primary purpose of the CPR is to remove technical barriers to trade for product manufacturers within the Internal market through the development and adoption of common European technical specifications (harmonised product standards and European Technical Approvals (ETAs) in case there is no harmonised product standard yet).

With the publication of EN 16034 conflicting national standards shall be withdrawn within a transitional period of 3 years (co-existence period). Product manufacturers can sell their products throughout Europe by complying with a single common specification recognised and accepted by all Member States, rather than having to test and comply with different national standards in each of them.

EN 16034 shall be implemented on a national level by national standardization bodies. Any conflicting national standards and / or national regulations have to be withdrawn latest when the co-existence period ends. The national editions of the standard receive the code of the national standardization body as prefix - for example DIN EN 16034 in Germany or UNI EN 16034 in Italy.

Products which are covered by EN 16034 have to be CE marked when placed on the market. CE marking enables free trade within all Member States. This is a major change as the affixing of the CE marking under the provisions of the old Construction Products Directive (CPD) which has been replaced by the Construction Products Regulation (CPR) was wrongly considered to be voluntary.

Rumors & News 

As of October 10, 2018 prEN 14351-2 has been approved. The CEN (European Committee for Standardization) website lists the following dates regarding its publication:
 date of Availability (DAV): 2018-Nov-07
 date of Announcement (DOA): 2019-Feb-28
 date of Publication (DOP): 2019-May-31
 date of Withdrawal (DOW): 2021-Aug-31,

where DAV refers to the date when the definitive text in the official language versions of an approved norm is distributed by the Central Secretariat, DAO refers to the latest date by which the existence of a European norm has to be announced at the national level, DOP refers to the latest date by which a European norm has to be implemented at national level by publication and DOW refers to the date by which national standards conflicting with a European norm have to be withdrawn. Especially the two dates DOP and DOW are interesting. The first (DOP) will indicate when this new norm will in effect start its validity (by what date one can CE mark doors for internal use on a voluntary basis) and the end of the coexistence period (by what date the new standard must be used and old products based on the prior national norms can no longer be put onto the market). The second date (DOW) gives a good indication of how long this coexistence period will be (even though it is just an indication and only the publication DOP will indicate the definitive date.) In between the two dates both norms (the national one and the new European one) will coexist and both will need to be accepted by national authorities.

Interpretation of current situation 

Most fire rated doors are used as internal doors (around 90% of the European market in terms of quantity). Given that EN 16034 can only be used in conjunction with other standards (internal, external, power operated pedestrian doors, industrial doors) and given that the standard for internal doors is a work in progress (prEN 14351-2)  the applicability date of 1 November 2019 will not change anything for the sector. Most fire rated doors currently still cannot be CE marked.

It is important to understand that the fire resisting and/or smoke control product is defined as doorset including any frame or guide, door leaf or leaves, rolling or folding curtain, etc., which is provided to give a fire resisting and/or smoke control capability when used for the closing of permanent openings in fire resisting separating elements, including any side panel(s), vision panel(s), flush over panel(s), transom panel(s) and/or glazing together with the building hardware and any seals (whether provided for the purpose of fire resistance or smoke control) which form the assembly.

History 
In 1994 the European Commission has invited the European Standardization bodies CEN and CENELEC to draw up a common European standard for fire and smoke proof doors. In 2015 the final version has been published under the standard code EN 16034 on the Official Journal of the European Union.

Scope 

This European Standard identifies safety and performance requirements applicable to all fire resisting and/or smoke control products intended to be used in fire and/or smoke compartmentation and/or escape routes, which are either:
 industrial, commercial and/or garage doorsets
 rolling shutters or operable fabric curtains
 pedestrian doorsets and/or openable windows and/or inspection hatches which are hinged or sliding

and either:
 opening and self-closing
 normally held open but self-closing in case of fire or smoke
 normally maintained locked in the closed position

and completed:
 with building hardware, 
 with or without any side or flush over or transom panel
 with or without any vision panels in the door leaves
 with or without any seal

It is important to understand that the fire resisting and/or smoke control product is defined as doorset including any frame or guide, door leaf or leaves, rolling or folding curtain, etc., which is provided to give a fire resisting and/or smoke control capability when used for the closing of permanent openings in fire resisting separating elements, including any side panel(s), vision panel(s), flush over panel(s), transom panel(s) and/or glazing together with the building hardware and any seals (whether provided for the purpose of fire resistance or smoke control) which form the assembly.

Exclusions 
This European Standard does not cover:
 fixed windows
 doors produced with components from several sources without a single manufacturer taking responsibility for the finished product

Product characteristics 
EN 16034 covers several essential characteristics related to the intended use of the construction product which are in particular:
 Resistance to fire providing "integrity" (E), "integrity and insulation (EI1, EI2) or "integrity and radiation" (EW) for a certain period of time expressed in minutes
 Smoke control to prevent smoke leakage at medium temperature (S200) or at ambient temperature (Sa)
 Ability to be released from an eventual hold-open device (i.e. electromagnet) to enable a reliable closing
 Durability of the ability to release
 Self-closing into its frame without human intervention (C)
 Durability of self-closing against degradation (C + digit 0-5 according to cycles)
 Durability of self-closing against ageing (corrosion)

Testing and classification 
All characteristics covered by this standard shall be determined with tests performed by an independent third party (Notified Test Body) under the responsibility of a Notified Product Certification Body responsible for the interpretation and classification of the obtained test results.

Before the resistance to fire and/or smoke control the sample shall undergo a pre-test conditioning which is performed with:
 at least 25 cycles of opening/closing
 at least 5000 cycles of opening/closing case of use of friable materials in the door construction (i.e. plasterboard)

After which, the various characteristics are evaluated:

Procedure 

Doors, gates and windows covered by EN 16034 are subject to system 1 of the Assessment and Verification of Constancy of Performance (short AVCP) which means that the manufacturer in addition to the mentioned test and classification process is also under the surveillance of a Notified Surveillance Body responsible for the continuous surveillance and assessment of the Factory Production Control (short FPC).

Initial Type Testing (ITT) 
The manufacturer shall decide the use of his product (scope). On this basis the Notified Product Certification Body (NPC) will set a testing program (optionally grouping different types of products into families of products) which must be absolved successfully at a Notified Testing Laboratory resulting in a test report for each performed test. The Notified Testing Laboratory can but must not be identical to the NPC.

The achieved results are then interpreted and classified by the NPC and eventually extended by the use of the "direct" and "extended field of application" in order to allow for different dimensions, use of different hardware, etc.

Factory Production Control (FPC) 
After the successful testing and assessment of the product the Notified Product Certification Body inspects the manufacturing plant (Initial inspection) and assesses the Factory Production Control system (i.e. ISO or similar). If successful, the NPC may issue a "Certificate of Constancy of Performance" which forms the basis of the "Declaration of Performance" (short DoP) allowing the manufacturer to CE mark his products.

The manufacturer is furthermore responsible for testing further samples taken directly from the manufacturing plant to keep and maintain his "Certificate of Constancy of Performance" valid and to be able to continue to CE mark his products.

Classification report according to EN 13501-2 
This report classifies the products based on the tests carried out, describes in details the components used and defines the boundaries of the product system with the "Field of Direct Application". The field of direct application lists the possible substitutions of components and deviations from the tested models. The field of direct application is very limited and allows modifications only to a strict extend.

EXAP report (extended field of application) 
The EXAP report according to EN 15269-series defines the permitted extended variations of tested products (i.e. extension of dimensions, interchangeability of materials, door  hardware, constructive details, …) from the tested specimens. The detailed rules for each appropriate material selection are defined in the relevant part of EN 15269-series.
Currently the following EXAPs are available or in preparation:

Cascading 
To allow a "reuse" of the tested products the initial manufacturer can collaborate under a contract with "system providers" (or system houses) and delegate/outsource/franchise the production to them. Given that fire and smoke products are covered by AVCP system 1, the system provider has to undergo the Factory Production Control (FPC) and the Continuous surveillance by an Notified Surveillance Body himself. Practically the system provider can avoid to do the initial type testing reusing the classification reports and extended application reports from the original manufacturer.

CE Marking 

Products certified according to EN 16034 in combination with either EN 14351-1 (external pedestrian doors, prEN 14351-2 (internal pedestrian doors), EN 13241 (industrial, garage, commercial doors) and EN 16361 (power operated pedestrian doors) can be CE marked with the proper CE marking symbol.
The CE marking logo shall be affixed before the product is placed on the market together with the following information:
 the notified product certification body
 the name of the manufacturer
 the address of the manufacturer
 the last two digits of the year, when the certificate was obtained
 the reference number of the declaration of performance (DoP)
 the dated reference to the applied harmonized standard/s (in this case EN 16034 + one of the 4 above mentioned)
 the unique identification code of the product
 the intended use of the product
 the classes declared

Declaration of Performance (DoP) 

EN 16034 requires the distribution of a Declaration of Performance (DoP), to which every customer or user shall have access.

The DoP lists all essential characteristic of the product as required by EN 16034. The manufacturer shall at least declare one characteristic with a result.
Other characteristics can be declared as NPD (“no performance determined).

DoPs are to be provided either in paper form or by electronic means in the language/s of the member state with every product delivered. The declaration of performance for products with fire resisting and/or smoke control characteristics shall contain at least the following details:

 reference of the product-type
 reference to the system “AVCP 1”
 the listing of the relevant harmonized standard “EN 16034”
 the intended use for the construction product
 list of essential characteristics for the declared intended use and its relative performance/s

Difference to other certification systems

Normative references
The European test series for fire resisting doorsets are based on the test standard EN 1634-1 (describes the general principles of the fire resistance and smoke control tests of the doors), the series of test standards EN 1363 (general requirements of the test itself and the furnace) and the classification standard EN 13501-2 (Definition of fire resistance classes).

The US tests for Fire rated doors are based on the NFPA 252 "Standard Methods of Fire Tests of Door Assemblies", the UL 10B "Fire Tests of Door Assemblies" and the UL 10C "Positive Pressure Fire Tests of Door Assemblies".

Large differences exist in opening directions to be tested (EN requires both sides to be tested, UL one side only), permitted wall types (EN lists 3 types of walls, whereas UL does not differ at all), surface temperatures permitted (UL measures the first 30 minutes only, whereas EN the full duration of the test) and sustained flaming allowances (EN no flaming, UL several types and durations allowed). Another major difference is the treatment of the exchangeability of components such as locks, hinges, and frame types. The EN standard basically requires each combination to be tested as a whole, where as UL is satisfied with the single component being tested independently from the door assembly. Further the EN standard differs in its treatment of the extension of dimensions from the UL standard. EN allows for only limited dimensional extensions, but requires in such cases a surplus of test time and better gap values. Whereas the UL Standard does not allow an increase of the dimension of the tested door, you can decrease the dimension without any restriction.  Last but not least, UL requires at the end of the fire exposure a hose stream test, where water from a hose is directed to the tested assembly. No water shall penetrate and the door shall withstand the impact. The EN standard does not mention anything similar.

Differences in furnace time / temperature curve
The furnace time / temperature curves differ between the standards UL 10B and EN 1363-1 in that the UL standard focuses most of its rigour around the 20th minute. During the period of 10 to 30 minutes, the furnace temperature is slightly higher according to the UL standard, before and after that, the furnace temperature required by the EN Standard is higher.

The permitted percentile error quote in the curve's average furnace temperature is more stringent according to the UL Standard until the 20th minute, after that the EN standard is more severe.

Difference in the neutral pressure requirement
The neutral pressure requirements for furnaces according EN 1363-1 are stricter than the pressure criteria requirements of UL 10C. According to the EN standard, the furnace is operated so that the neutral pressure plane (a pressure of zero) is established at 500 mm (less than 20 inches) above notional floor level. Irrespective of this, the pressure at the top of the test specimen shall at no time exceed 20 Pa. (See EN 1363-1 par. 5.2.2.1)

For UL 10C, "the neural plane of the furnace is to be established at a maximum of 40 inches (1016mm) up from the bottom of the test assembly. The pressure that is maintained over the top one-third of the door assembly is not to exceed 0.08 inch H2O (20 Pa) over any portion of the test sample." (Reference: UL 10C par. 11.2 and par. 11.3)
For UL 10B, the pressure in the furnace chamber is to be 0 +/-0.01 inches H2O at the top of the door.

Difference in opening directions to be tested
For insulated steel doors EN 1634-1 requires testing in both opening directions (away from the furnace and into the furnace), whereas UL 10C only requires test orientation into the furnace.

Permitted wall types
The EN standard introduces the concept of standard supporting constructions (essentially wall types). These are the constructions into which the test specimen is allowed to be built. The available standard supporting constructions are:
 High density rigid construction: Blockwork, masonry or homogeneous concrete wall 
 Low density rigid construction: Aerated concrete block wall 
 Flexible construction: Lightweight plasterboard faced steel stud partition
Given that these different wall types are of different rigidities and perform differently in fire conditions, the EN standard requires that the certificate of fired doors indicates for what wall type it has been tested. The UL Standard does not specify any such supporting construction types.

Integrity and surface temperatures
The UL standard provides that the unexposed surface temperatures be recorded only for the first 30 minutes of the test. The fire doors are then rated as temperature rise doors for 250 °F, 450 °F or 650 °F, respectively 121,11º degrees, 232,22º degrees and 343,33º degrees Celsius.

The EN standard requests the integrity criteria of the door to be expressed in completed minutes for which the test specimen continues to maintain its separating function during the test without developing temperatures above the initial average tempera¬ture on its unexposed sur¬face which either: 
 increase the average temperature by no more than 140 °C  (284 °F)
 and increase the temperature at any location by no more than 180 °C (356 °F).
The purpose of average unexposed face temperature measurement is to determine the general level of insulation of the test specimen while ignoring particular hot spots. The purpose of maximum unexposed face temperature measurement is to determine the level of insulation at those locations where higher temperatures are expected to occur. To understand the importance of surface temperature go to youtube and search for "7Afz5sy2808".

Difference in flaming measurement
The EN 1363-1 standard requires that the specimen continues to maintain its separating function during the test without either:
 Causing ignition of a cotton pad
 Permitting penetration of a gap gauge
 Resulting sustained flaming which last over 10 seconds during each moment of the test
The UL 10B Standard expresses the following concerning the flaming:
 No flaming shall occur on the unexposed surface of a door assembly during the first 30 minutes of the classification period.
 After 30 minutes, intermittent light flaming [6 inches (152 mm) long], for periods not exceeding 5-minute intervals, is capable of occurring along the edges of doors.
 Light flaming is capable of occurring during the last 15 minutes of the classification period on the unexposed surface area of the door, when it is contained within a distance of 1-1/2 inches (38.1mm) from a vertical door edge and within 3 inches (76.2 mm) from the top edge of the door and within 3 inches (76.2mm) from the top edge of the frame of a vision panel (Reference: UL 10B par. 13.1).

Whereas the UL 10C Standard states:
 No flaming shall occur on the unexposed surface of a door assembly nor shall the sample permit the passage of hot gases sufficient to ignite the cotton pad.
 Exception No. 1: Sustained flaming of less than 10 seconds duration is permitted.
 Exception No. 2: After 30 minutes, intermittent light flaming [not greater than 6 inches (152 mm) long, nor burning for periods exceeding 5-minute intervals, along the edges of doors] is permitted.
 Exception No. 3: Light flaming during the last 15 minutes of the classification period of 45 minutes or greater, is permitted on the unexposed surface area of the door, when it is contained within a distance of 1-1/2 inches (38.1 mm) from a vertical door edge, and within 3 inches (76.2 mm) from the top edge of the door and within 3 inches from the top edge of the frame of a vision panel (Reference: UL 10C par. 15.1)

Exchangeability of components
UL allows an individual composition of the door set from various components such as hinges, locks, frames, door leaves etc. as long as every single component has satisfied the UL standard and been tested individually as such. This is not true for the EN standard. Even though for each component there is a separate test standard available, which the single hardware component must satisfy, the EN standard allows only for the tested composition of components. Therefore exchanging hinges, locks, steel sheet thicknesses, etc. is generally not possible without additional tests.

Hose Stream Test
Contrary to the EN Standard, the UL Standards 10B and 10C requires a Hose Stream Test, which measures integrity of specimens after exposure to fire. This includes that immediately within 3 minutes (according to UL 10B, the UL 10C stipulate  minutes) after the termination of the fire resistance test, the tested door is to start to be subjected to the impact, erosion, and cooling effects of a hose stream directed ?rst at the bottom center of the assembly and then at all parts of the exposed surface (according to a Hose steam pattern which is specified in the UL standards UL 10B and UL 10C). This can cause penetration of the assembly, breakage and dislodgement of hardware or glazing. (See: UL 10C par. 12.1 and par. 10.1)

See also 
List of EN standards
European Committee for Standardization
Fire test
UL Safety Organisation
NFPA National Fire Protection Association

References

External links 
European Committee for Standardization
EN 16034 - CEN/TC 33, Published standard
 Construction Product Regulation, Regulation (EU) No 305/2011 - EUR-Lex
 M/101 Mandate to CEN and CENELEC

16034
Fire test standards
Passive fire protection